Olympique de Cayenne is a Guianan football club based in Cayenne. The club competes in the Ligue de Guyane, the top tier of French Guianan football.

History
Olympique de Cayenne was founded on 27 November 1927. The team won the 2019–20 French Guiana Honor Division and earned the right to compete at the 2021 Caribbean Club Championship.

International competition
The following is a list of results for Olympique de Cayenne in international competitions. The club's scores are listed first.

Honours
Ligue de Guyane: 2019–20

External links
Official website
FFF profile
Soccerway profile

References

Football clubs in French Guiana
Cayenne